Oxythyreus is a genus of ambush bugs. Species in this genus are known only from southern Africa.

Species include:

 Oxythyreus slateri Doesburg & Pluot-Sigwalt, 2007
 Oxythyreus ruckesi Kormilev, 1962
 Oxythyreus cylindricornis Westwood, 1841
O. c. schuhi Doesburg & Pluot-Sigwalt, 2007

References 

Hemiptera genera
Reduviidae